Khalid Abdulaziz Al-Ghwinem (born April 17, 1999) is a Saudi Arabian  professional footballer who currently plays as a midfielder for Ohod.

Career
He made his first-team debut in the 2019 AFC Champions League group stage match against Al-Zawra'a. The match ended in a 2–1 win for Al-Nassr. He made his league debut on 19 December 2019, coming off the bench against Al-Adalah.

On 15 October 2020, Al-Ghwinem joined Al-Tai on loan until the end of the season. He made 8 appearances before his loan was cut short. On 15 February 2021, Al-Ghwinem joined Al-Thoqbah on loan until the end of the season. On 31 August 2021, Al-Ghwinem joined Al-Shoulla on loan. On 22 July 2022, Al-Ghwinem joined Ohod on a free transfer.

Club career statistics
As of 15 February 2021.

External links

References

1999 births
Saudi Arabian footballers
Sportspeople from Riyadh
Living people
Al Nassr FC players
Al-Tai FC players
Al-Thoqbah Club players
Al-Shoulla FC players
Ohod Club players
Saudi Professional League players
Saudi First Division League players
Association football midfielders